Seyyedabad (also Romanized as Seyyedābād) is a village in Piveh Zhan Rural District, Ahmadabad District, Mashhad County, Razavi Khorasan Province, Iran. At the 2006 census, its population was 776, in 192 families.

References 

Populated places in Mashhad County